The Hexi Cashmere goat breed from desert and semidesert regions of the North Gansu province of China is used primarily for the production of cashmere fiber. About 60% of the goats are white. The Hexi cashmere can be found in the Gansu, Qinghai and Ningxia provinces. A typical adult doe produces 184 grams of down at 15.7 micrometres (µm) diameter.

See also
Cashmere goat

Sources
Hexi Cashmere Goat

Goat breeds
Fiber-producing goat breeds
Goat breeds originating in China
Cashmere wool